Ottenbach is a municipality in the district of Göppingen in Baden-Württemberg in southern Germany.

Geographical location
Ottenbach is located in the upper valley of the Krumm between the mountains Hohenstaufen in west-northwest, the Rechberg in the northeast and the Stuifen, on the foothills of the eastern Swabian Jura. From the county town Göppingen the distance is in a straight line approximately eight kilometers northeast and about as far southwest from Schwäbisch Gmünd.

Municipality arrangement
Ottenbach includes the village Ottenbach, the Weiler Geyrenwald, Jackenhof, Kitzen, Schurrenhof and Stixenhöfe, die Höfe Bärenhöfe, Breitfelder Hof, Cyriakushof, Etzberg, Feuerleshof, Fladenhof, Haldenhof, Herbenhof, Holzhäuser Hof, Kübelhof, Lindenhöfe, Lochhof, Merzenhöfe, Neuhof, Obergruppenhof, Obermühleisenhof, Peterlingshöfe, Saurenhof, Schonterhöfe, Sonnental (Fuchstal), Strudelhof, Untermühleisenhöfe, Waldenhof and Wannenhof and the house Schafhöfle.

Sports
Cycling: Nationally known is Ottenbach for the organization and conduct of mass sports bike marathon "Alb-extreme". The itinerary leads annually on the last Sunday in June over a distance of 190, 210 and 260 km through the countryside of the Swabian Jura with many elevations.

Economy and Infrastructure

Transportation
Ottenbach has no train station,  but is integrated via the bus line 6 with several stops in Ottenbach in the Filsland-bus network.

Education
In Ottenbach there is a primary school, all secondary schools can be found in surrounding communities or cities. Secondary schools are in Eislingen and Göppingen.

Sons and daughters of the town
Bruno Klaus (1848-1915), teacher and local historian, honorary citizen of Schwäbisch Gmünd
Arthur Mayer (1911-1998), psychologist

References

Towns in Baden-Württemberg
Göppingen (district)